Yoo Ji-hoon  (born 9 June 1988) is a South Korean footballer who plays as a defender for Gyeongnam FC.

Club career statistics

External links 

1988 births
Living people
People from Namyangju
South Korean footballers
Association football defenders
Gyeongnam FC players
Busan IPark players
Gimcheon Sangmu FC players
Seoul E-Land FC players
K League 1 players
K League 2 players
Hanyang University alumni
Sportspeople from Gyeonggi Province